Snake River Falls is a shoot-the-chutes water ride attraction located at Cedar Point in Sandusky, Ohio. Designed by Arrow Dynamics, the ride opened to the public on May 8, 1993. Its theme is loosely based on a wood packing company, and it is one of three water rides at Cedar Point along with Thunder Canyon, and Snake River Expedition.

Snake River Falls debuted as the tallest, fastest and steepest water ride in the world. Guests board flat bottom, 20-passenger boats that advance directly onto the lift hill. A bridge sites at the bottom of the hill directly over the path of the ride providing spectators a view up close and the opportunity to get wet. An artificial mountain was originally planned to sit underneath the highest point of the track, but the idea was later abandoned.

From the ride's opening in 1993 until the 2012 season, Snake River Falls was sponsored by Pepsi. After Cedar Point switched to Coca-Cola in 2013, the ride now operates without a sponsor.

Incidents
 On Wednesday, July 3, 2013, a boat on Snake River Falls jumped the track after the drop, dislodging the boat. Riders did not report any injuries. Cedar Point stated the incident was caused by a low water level throughout the ride. The ride was closed down for the day and inspected, and reopened on Sunday.

References

External links

 
 Snake River Falls Photo Gallery at The Point Online

Cedar Point
Amusement rides introduced in 1993
Cedar Fair attractions
1993 establishments in Ohio